Gerda Seray is a district of Paktia Province, Afghanistan. It was created in 2005 within Wuza Zadran District. The estimated population in 2021 was 12,684.

References

Districts of Paktia Province